Ryan Airlines may refer to:

 Ryan Aeronautical, a San Diego aircraft manufacturer founded in 1934. After 1969, part of Teledyne and later, Northrop Grumman
 Ryan Air Services, a cargo and passenger airline operating in Bush Alaska
 Ryan Airline Company, an early aviation concern associated with Charles Lindbergh
 Ryan International Airlines, a defunct American charter airline
 Ryanair, a budget airline based in Ireland

See also
 Rayani Air, former Malaysian carrier